The Ihme-Zentrum is a residential, business and shopping center in Hanover between the Linden and Calenberger Neustadt quarters. It is located west at the bank of the Ihme river.

Size 

It has a commercial and shopping areas of 60.000 m² and residential areas of 58,300 m² for about 860 apartments (about 2,400 people) and 8,000 m² for about 450 students. There are 3 high buildings (about 20 floors) for residential and one for office use.

Current rebuild 
In July 2006 the ownership of the office and commercial areas changed from Engel to the American Carlyle Group. In 2019, it changed to the Tennor group of Lars Windhorst.

External links 

 http://www.ihme-zentrum.de Website about the "Ihme-Zentrum" (German)

Buildings and structures in Hanover
Shopping malls in Germany
Tourist attractions in Hanover